United States presidents issue executive orders to help officers and agencies of the executive branch manage the operations within the federal government itself.

Donald Trump signed a total of 220 executive orders from January 2017 to January 2021.

Cumulative number of executive orders signed by Donald Trump

2017

2018

2019

2020

2021

References

Notes

  National security directives are generally highly classified and are not executive orders. However, in an unprecedented move, the Trump administration ordered their national security directives to be published in the Federal Register.
  National Security and Homeland Security Presidential Directives address continuity of government in the event of a "catastrophic emergency" disrupting the U.S. population, economy, environment, infrastructure and government policy.
  On April 25, 2017, United States district judge of the United States District Court for the Northern District of California William Orrick III ruled that Trump exceeded his presidential authority when he signed EO 13768 on January 25, 2017, directing his administration to withhold all federal funding from local jurisdictions deemed to be "sanctuary jurisdictions" including "sanctuary cities" by issuing a preliminary injunction.  Judge Orrick subsequently issued a nationwide permanent injunction on November 20, 2017, declaring that section 9(a) of Executive Order 13768 was "unconstitutional on its face" and violates "the separation of powers doctrine and deprives [the plaintiffs] of their Tenth and Fifth Amendment rights."
  Revoked by: EO 13780, of March 16, 2017.
  Revokes: EO 13769, of March 16, 2017.
  On March 15, 2017, Judge Derrick Watson of the United States District Court for the District of Hawaii issued a temporary restraining order enjoining the government from enforcing several key provisions of the order (Sections 2 and 6). The judge claimed the executive order was likely motivated by anti-Muslim sentiment and thus breached the Establishment Clause of the United States Constitution. On the same date, Judge Theodore Chuang of the United States District Court for the District of Maryland reached a similar conclusion (enjoining Section 2(c) only). The Department of Justice stated that it "will continue to defend [the] Executive Order in the courts". Shortly following arguments from the state of Hawaii and the Department of Justice, the restraining order was converted by Watson into an indefinite preliminary injunction on March 29.
  United States Court of Appeals for the Fourth Circuit in Richmond, Virginia, refused on May 25, 2017, to reinstate the ban, citing religious discrimination. On June 1, 2017, the Trump administration appealed to the U.S. Supreme Court for the cancellation of the preliminary injunctions and to allow the order to go into effect while the court looks at its ultimate legality later in the year. On June 26, 2017, the Supreme Court partially lifted the halt and will hear oral arguments for the petition to vacate the injunctions in the fall.
  Revokes: EO 13673 of July 31, 2014, section 3 of EO 13683 of December 11, 2014, and EO 13738 of August 23, 2016.
  Revokes: EO 13775 of February 9, 2017.
  Revokes: EO 13575 (Establishment of the White House Rural Council) of June 9, 2011.
  Amends: EO 13067 of November 3, 1997; EO 13412 of October 13, 2006; and EO 13761 of January 13, 2017.
  Revised: Regarding Construction of the Dakota Access Pipeline of January 24, 2017. Document Citation:82 FR 11129. Document Number:R1-2017-02032. Revised on February 17, 2017.
  , 
  On April 26, 2017, Trump announced that he would not have the United States withdraw from the NAFTA Negotiations and Agreement. He will attempt to re-negotiate the agreement with Canada and Mexico.
  Revokes: Presidential Memorandum 10 of January 28, 2017.
  Continues: EO 13664, of April 3, 2014.
  Continues: EO 13694, of December 28, 2016.
  Continues: EO 13536, of April 12, 2010.
  Continues: EO 13611, of May 16, 2012.
  Continues: EO 13338, of May 11, 2004.
  Continues: EO 13667, of May 12, 2014.
  Continues: EO 13303, of May 22, 2003.
  Continues: EO 13405, of June 16, 2006.
  Continues: EO 13466, of June 26, 2008; Expanded in scope in EO 13551 of August 30, 2010; Addressed further in EO 13570 of April 18, 2011; Further expanded in scope in EO 13687 of January 2, 2015; Under which additional steps were taken in EO 13722 of March 15, 2016.
  Continues: EO 13219 of June 26, 2001.
  Continues: EO 13581 of July 25, 2011.
  Revokes: Notice 11 of July 19, 2017; Continues: EO 13581 of July 25, 2011.
  Continues: EO 13341 of August 1, 2007.
  Continues: EO 13222 of August 17, 2001; Amended by EO 13637 of March 8, 2013.
  Continues: Proclamation 7463 of September 14, 2001.
  Continues: EO 13224 of September 23, 2001.
  Revokes: EO 13522 of December 9, 2009.
  Amends: EO 13597 of January 19, 2012.
  Proclamation 9645 of September 24, 2017, supplements EO 13780 of March 6, 2017.
  On October 17, 2017, Judge Derrick Watson, of the United States District Court for the District of Hawaii issued another temporary restraining order that was asked by the state of Hawaii. Watson's decision noted that the latest ban "suffers from precisely the same maladies as its predecessor" as it "plainly discriminates based on nationality" and as such violates federal law and "the founding principles of this Nation."
  Continues: EO 12978 of October 21, 1995.
  Amends: EO 13223 of September 14, 2001.
  Presidential Determination No. 2017-15 of September 30, 2017, is not in the White House's official website. Presidential Determination No. 2017-14 of September 30, 2017, is listed twice.
  President John F. Kennedy Assassination Records Collection Act of 1992 stated that the records had to be released after 25 years of the signing date (October 26, 1992). Only 2,800 records of the 29,000 were released on October 26, 2017. The next day, Trump said he would begin to roll out the rest of the records as they were processed and deemed not to raise national security concerns. On November 3, 2017, the National Archives released 676 C.I.A. records.
  Continues: EO 13413 of October 27, 2006.
  Continues: EO 13067 of November 3, 1997; Continues expansion: EO 13400 of April 26, 2006; Additional steps were taken in EO 13412 of October 13, 2006, EO 13761 of January 13, 2017, and EO 13804 of July 11, 2017.
  Continues: EO 12170 of November 14, 1979.
  Continues: EO 13712 of November 22, 2015.
  On April 25, 2017, United States District Judge of the United States District Court for the Northern District of California William Orrick III had temporarily imposed a block on EO 13768. On November 20, 2017, Orrick permanently blocked EO 13768 (Enhancing Public Safety in the Interior of the United States). With lawsuits brought by San Francisco and Santa Clara counties, Orrick ruled that the Trump administration can't set new conditions on spending approved by Congress. Orrick found the order unconstitutional. In the judge's decision, the Trump administration's efforts to move local officials to cooperate with its efforts to deport undocumented immigrants violated the separation of powers doctrine as well as the Fifth and Tenth amendments. Orrick said that the order was written broadly to "reach all federal grants" and potentially jeopardized hundreds of millions of dollars in funding to San Francisco and Santa Clara.
  Continues: EO 12938 of November 14, 1994.
   signed into law on July 15, 2016.
  Revokes: EO 11580 of January 20, 1971 (Establishing a Seal for the National Credit Union Administration).
  US Supreme Court upholds the third travel ban.

Citations

Sources

External links
Executive orders listed on the Federal Registers official website
Executive orders, presidential memoranda, and presidential proclamations on the White House's official website
GPO's Federal Digital System (FDsys) - Bulk Data, Download multiple issues of the Federal Register or latest Code of Federal Regulations in XML.
Executive Office of the President

Executive orders by Donald Trump
 Trump
Executive actions
Executive orders by Donald Trump
2017-related lists
2017 beginnings
2018-related lists
2019-related lists
2020-related lists